Gédéon Foulquier (1855-1941), was a French entomologist who specialised in Lepidoptera.  He wrote with Charles Oberthür Catalogue raisonné des Lepidoptères des Bouches-du-Rhône (principalement des environs de Marseille et d'Aix). Premier partie, Rhopalocères. Marseille : Librairie Ruat, 1899.

Gédéon Foulquier lived in Marseille. His collection is held by Musée Pyrénéen in Lourdes.

References
Paulus Marcel, 1944 (janvier).  Nécrologie  Gédéon Foulquier (1855-1941), Bull.Soc. linn. Provence 15 (n°1) : 16-19

French lepidopterists
1855 births
1941 deaths
19th-century French zoologists
20th-century French zoologists
Date of birth missing
Date of death missing
Scientists from Marseille